The 1984–85 season was FC Dinamo București's 36th season in Divizia A. Dinamo starts the season with a new manager, Cornel Dinu being promoted from his assistant position. In the Romanian championship, Dinamo finishes second, after three consecutive titles, being overtaken by Steaua, the same team that beat them in the semifinals of the Romanian Cup.

In the first round of the European Champions Cup, Dinamo meets Omonia Nicosia: 4-1 and 1–2. Next is the match against Girondins Bordeaux (club of Tigana, Giresse, Lacombe and Battiston), Dinamo being eliminated after 0-1 and 1-1.

Results

European Cup 

First round

Dinamo București won 5–3 on aggregate

Second round

FC Girondins de Bordeaux won 2-1 on aggregate

Squad 

Goalkeepers:  Dumitru Moraru, Ovidiu Barba, Constantin Eftimescu, Andrei Toma

Defenders: Mircea Rednic, Ioan Andone, Ion Marin, Nelu Stănescu, Cornel Mirea, Alexandru Nicolae, Nicușor Vlad, Teofil Stredie, Eugen Frîncu, Niculae Ivan.

Midfielders: Ionel Augustin, Marin Dragnea, Gheorghe Mulțescu, Alexandru Suciu, Ioan Zare, Lică Movilă, Grațian Moldovan.

Forwards: Marian Damaschin, Costel Orac, Cornel Țălnar,  Gheorghe Tulba, Sorin Răducanu.

Transfers 

Dinamo brought Alexandru Suciu (U Cluj), Nicușor Vlad and Teofil Stredie (Corvinul). Marin Ion is transferred to FC Bihor. Sorin Răducanu makes his debut.

References 
 www.labtof.ro
 www.romaniansoccer.ro

1984
Association football clubs 1984–85 season
Romanian football clubs 1984–85 season